The 2017–18 Liga II (also known as 2017–18 Liga II Casa Pariurilor) was the 78th season of the Liga II, the second tier of the Romanian football league system. The season began on 5 August 2017 and ended on 2 June 2018.

A total of 20 teams contested the league. It was the second Liga II season with a single series. The season was played in a round-robin tournament. The first two teams promoted to Liga I at the end of the season and the third-placed team played a play-off match against the 12th-placed team from Liga I. The last five teams relegated to Liga III.

Team changes

To Liga II
Promoted from Liga III
 Știința Miroslava  (debut)
 Metaloglobus București  (debut)
 SCM Pitești  (after 4 years of absence)
 Ripensia Timișoara  (after 70 years of absence)
 Hermannstadt  (debut)
Relegated from Liga I
 Pandurii Târgu Jiu  (ended 12-year stay in the top flight)
 Târgu Mureș  (ended 4-year stay in the top flight)

From Liga II
Relegated to Liga III
 Râmnicu Vâlcea  (ended 12-year stay)
 Unirea Tărlungeni  (ended 4-year stay)
 Berceni  (ended 4-year stay)
 Șoimii Pâncota  (ended 3-year stay)
Promoted to Liga I
 Juventus București  (ended 1-year stay)
 Sepsi Sfântu Gheorghe  (ended 1-year stay)

Excluded teams
After the end of last season, Brașov was dissolved.

Teams spared from relegation
Metalul Reșița was spared from relegation due to withdrawal of Brașov.

Renamed teams
SCM Pitești bought FC Argeș brand and was renamed as Argeș Pitești.

Metalul Reșița was renamed as Sportul Snagov at one year after its movement to Snagov.

Stadiums by capacity

Stadiums by locations

Personnel and kits 

Note: Flags indicate national team as has been defined under FIFA eligibility rules. Players and Managers may hold more than one non-FIFA nationality.

Managerial changes

League table

Season results

Promotion/relegation play-offs
The 12th-placed team of the Liga I faces the 3rd-placed team of the Liga II.

|}

Notes:
 Voluntari qualified for 2018–19 Liga I and Chindia Târgoviște qualified for 2018–19 Liga II.

Season statistics

Top scorers
Updated to matches played on 2 June 2018.

Clean sheets
Updated to matches played on 2 June 2018.

*Only goalkeepers who played all 90 minutes of a match are taken into consideration.

Attendance

References

2017-18
Rom
2017–18 in Romanian football